Kyree Walker (born November 20, 2000) is an American professional basketball player who last played for the Capital City Go-Go of the NBA G League. At the high school level, he played for Moreau Catholic High School in Hayward, California before transferring to Hillcrest Prep Academy. A former MaxPreps National Freshman of the Year, Walker was a five-star recruit.

Early life and high school career
In eighth grade, Walker drew national attention for his slam dunks in highlight videos. He often faced older competition, including high school seniors, in middle school with his Amateur Athletic Union (AAU) team Oakland Soldiers. As a high school freshman, Walker played basketball for Moreau Catholic High School in Hayward, California, averaging 21.3 points, 6.5 rebounds and four assists per game. After leading his team to a California Interscholastic Federation Division II runner-up finish, he was named MaxPreps National Freshman of the Year. Entering his sophomore season, Walker transferred to Hillcrest Prep, a basketball program in Phoenix, Arizona, with his father, Khari, joining the coaching staff. On October 25, 2019, during his senior year, he left Hillcrest Prep, intending to move to the college or professional level. In December 2019, Walker graduated from high school but did not play high school basketball while weighing his options.

Recruiting
On June 30, 2017, Walker committed to play college basketball for Arizona State over several other NCAA Division I offers. At the time, he was considered a five-star recruit and a top five player in the 2020 class by major recruiting services. On October 21, 2018, Walker decommitted from Arizona State. On April 20, 2020, as a four-star recruit, he announced that he would forego college basketball.

Professional career

Capital City Go-Go (2021–2022)
Walker joined Chameleon BX to prepare for the 2021 NBA draft. For the 2021-22 season, he signed with the Capital City Go-Go of the NBA G League, joining the team after a successful tryout.

Personal life
In 2018, Walker's mother, Barrissa Gardner, was diagnosed with breast cancer but achieved remission in the following months.

References

2000 births
Living people
21st-century African-American sportspeople
African-American basketball players
American men's basketball players
Basketball players from Oakland, California
Capital City Go-Go players
Small forwards
Twitch (service) streamers